is a passenger railway station located in the town of Shimanto, Takaoka District, Kōchi Prefecture, Japan. It is operated by JR Shikoku and has the station number "K24".

Lines

Layout
Rokutanji Station, which is unstaffed, consists of a side platform serving a single track. There is no station building, only a shelter for waiting passengers. A ramp leads up from the access road to the platform.

Adjacent stations

History
The station was opened on 15 April 1961 by Japanese National Railways (JNR) as a new station on the existing Dosan Line. With the privatization of JNR on 1 April 1987, control of the station passed to JR Shikoku.

Surrounding area
Japan National Route 56

See also
 List of railway stations in Japan

References

External links
Station timetable

Railway stations in Kōchi Prefecture
Railway stations in Japan opened in 1961
Shimanto, Kōchi (town)